El Cercado is a town in the San Juan province of the Dominican Republic.

History
The community of El Cercado was founded in 1845 by President Pedro Santana. It previously belonged to the municipality of Bánica and was called the Sabana del Bohío, and was elevated to town by President Fernando Arturo de Meriño in 1888. The first families to settle in this area were Florencio Montero, Telésforo de Oleo, Encarnación, Manuelica y Fidel Matos and Leonardo Brito. El Cercado people have the reputation for being very hospitable, friendly and kind.

The main economic source is agriculture consisting of cattle, snuff, honey, wax, leather and coffee. The main form of communication was the horse, which started the mail service.

Climate

El Cercado has a tropical savanna climate (Köppen climate classification: Aw).

Personalities

References

Sources 
World Gazeteer: Dominican Republic – World-Gazetteer.com

Municipalities of the Dominican Republic
Populated places in San Juan Province (Dominican Republic)